Allium akirense is a species of flowering plant in the family Amaryllidaceae endemic to Israel. Is it closely related to Allium qasyunense. It is diploid having 14 chromosomes.

Etymology 
The name "akirense" derives from the Biblical Hebrew word "Ekron" and the Arabic word "Akir", both referring to the area where the species is found.

Description 
Allium akirense roots are between 10–15 cm long. Its stem is erect, cylindrical, smooth and between 15 and 50 cm tall. It also have green, dry leaves that are linear and flat between 12 and 40 cm and 1–3 mm wide. The leaves narrow towards the tip. Its ovary is yellow and sub-cylindrical.

Distribution and habitat 
This species is exclusively found on the coast of Israel, 25 km south of Tel Aviv, The plain is densely settled and a lot of agriculture and cultivation occurs there. The original distribution of the species is unknown. It is estimated to occupy an area of around 8 km2.

There are eight known sub-populations of Allium akirense. Three of them have hundreds of individuals, while the other five only have a few.

Conservation 
It is list as critically endangered by IUCN with a decreasing population trend. It is believed that there are only about 3,000 mature individuals left.

Threats 
Urban and industrial development poses a serious threat to the species. They are also threatened by agriculture of non-timber crops which has caused stress on the local ecosystem.

Conservation 
Although this species is critically endangered, the species is not in protected areas. They are currently under ex-situ conservation at the Jerusalem Botanical Gardens.

See also 

 Flora of Israel
 List of critically endangered plants

References 

akirense